Andrew Sanger (born 1948) is a British freelance journalist and travel writer, best known for many popular travel guides to France and the French regions, although he has also authored more than 40 guides to other locations, and four novels.

Sanger was educated at the Lycée Français Charles de Gaulle in London, Colchester Royal Grammar School, University College London and Sussex University.

Sanger is the author of The Vegetarian Traveller (1987), a guide to the foods and eating habits around Europe and the Mediterranean, which was one of the first travel guides for vegetarians and was a best-seller in the United Kingdom; and a commentary on Robert Louis Stevenson's An Inland Voyage (1991). His guide Exploring Rural France (1988 and subsequent editions) gave early encouragement to ordinary tourists visiting France to get off the beaten track and discover more about the country. The book gave a rise to a series published by A&C Black (London) urging the same approach to other countries. Sanger also published a memoir or novel, Love (2005 and 2015), describing his life in Berkeley, California during the "Summer of Love" and travels during the hippy era, including the "hippie trail" to India. 

Sanger's novel The J-Word (2009 and 2018), about secular Jewish identity, is not on a travel-related theme, and is set in the neighbourhood of Golders Green in his native north-west London. The J-Word featured at London's Hampstead & Highgate Literary Festival (2009) and Jewish Book Week (2009). The J-Word is a set reading list book on the "Judaism as a Lived Religion" course at Lund University, Sweden. Sanger's novel The Slave (2013), about human trafficking and slavery, is also set in Golders Green. The Unknown Mrs Rosen (2020), about a courageous former spy now elderly and in need of care, has a more evident travel connection with settings in various parts of the UK, Germany and France.

In addition, Sanger has written hundreds of articles, almost all on travel, for British newspapers and other publications. From 1990 to 1999, he was editor of the French Railways (later Rail Europe) customer magazine Top Rail. In 1994 and 1996 he received Travelex Travel Writers' Awards for articles published in BBC Holiday Magazine and in Rail Europe Magazine. Sanger is a member of Travelwriters UK and the British Guild of Travel Writers.

Selected bibliography
The Unknown Mrs Rosen. (Focus Books, 2020. )
DK Eyewitness Top 10 Dublin. (co-author; Dorling Kindersley, new editions 2005, 2007, 2009, 2011, 2013, 2015, 2018. )
Love. (Focus Books, 2015. )
The Slave. (Focus Books, 2013. )
FootprintFocus Normandy Coast. (Footprint Handbooks, 2013. )
FootprintFocus Rouen & Upper Normandy. (Footprint Handbooks, 2013. )
Driving Guide – Provence & the Cote d'Azur. (4th edn, Thomas Cook, 2011)
Driving Guide – Loire Valley. (main author, 4th edn, Thomas Cook, 2011)
FootprintFrance Normandy. (1st edition, Footprint Handbooks, 2010. )
The J-Word. (Snowbooks, 2009. ; 2nd edition, Focus Books, 2018. )
Michelin Green Guide France. 2008.  (principal writer, English edition)
AA Essential Spiral Tenerife. AA, 2007. 
AA Essential Spiral Lanzarote. AA, 2007. 
Drive Around Loire Valley. Thomas Cook, 2007, 2009.  (main author)
Drive Around Burgundy. Thomas Cook, 2007, 2009. 
Drive Around Provence. Thomas Cook, 2007, 2009. 
AA Essential Channel Hopping. (AA, UK, 1999, 2001)
AA Essential Lanzarote & Fuerteventura. (AA, UK, 1999, 2000, 2001, 2002, 2003, 2004, relaunched as Essential Spiral 2007)
AA Essential Tenerife. (AA, UK, 2000, 2001, 2002, 203, 2004, 2005, 2006, 2007, relaunched as Essential Spiral 2007)
AA Explorer Israel. (AA, UK, 1996, 1998, 2000, 2006)
AA TwinPack Lanzarote & Fuerteventura. (AA, UK, 2002)
AA TwinPack Tenerife. (AA, UK, 2002. )
An Inland Voyage. (Guide by AS added to book by Robert Louis Stevenson, Cockbird Press, UK, 1991. )
Discover Brussels. (WHS/Thomas Cook, UK, 1999)
Exploring Rural France. (Helm/A&C Black, UK, 1988, 1990, 1993; Passport, US, 1988, 1990, 1993)
Exploring Rural Ireland. (Helm/A&C Black, UK, 1989; Passport, US, 1989; Mingus, Netherlands, 1991)
Eyewitness Top 10 Dublin. (Dorling Kindersley; co-author; first edition UK 2003 )
Fodors Exploring Israel. (Fodor. US. 1996, 1998, 2000)
God tur til Lanzarote & Fuerteventura. (Norway. 2000. )
HotSpots Lanzarote. (Thomas Cook, UK, 2006. )
Israel – US Library of Congress Talking Book. (Book no: 1984 – RC 20605; 1998 – RC 44904)
Languedoc & Roussillon. (Helm/A&C Black, UK, 1989, 1994, 1997; Passport, US, 1989; 1994, 1997)
Long Weekends in France. (Penguin, UK, 1992)
Must See Brussels. (Thomas Cook, UK, 1999)
Ontdek Landelijk Frankrijk. (Mingus, Netherlands, 1990)
Ontdek Landelijk Ierland. (Mingus, Netherlands, 1991).
Rough Guide to France, The. (co-author, 1st ed'n, Rough Guides, UK, 1986)
Signpost Guide Burgundy and the Rhone Valley. (Thomas Cook, UK, 2000; Globe Pequot, US. 2000)
Signpost Guide Loire Valley. (Thomas Cook, UK, 2002; Globe Pequot, US. 2002)
Signpost Guide: Provence & the Cote d'Azur. (Thomas Cook, UK, 2000; Globe Pequot, US. 2000)
South-West France. (Helm/A&C Black, UK, 1990, 1994; Passport, US, 1990, 1994)
Vegetarian Guide to Britain & Europe, The. (Simon & Schuster, UK, 1992)
Vegetarian Traveller, The. (Thorsons, UK, 1987; Grafton, UK, 1991; Mingus, Netherlands, 1992)
Vegetarier op Reis, De. (Mingus, Netherlands, 1992)
Villages of Northern France. (Pavilion, UK, 1994)
Viva Guide Israel. (Viva, Germany. 1996) 
Viva Twin Lanzarote & Fuerteventura. (Viva, Germany. 1999)

References

External links
Andrew Sanger's website
Andrew Sanger's entry on the travel writers' website
An Inland Voyage with Andrew Sanger's introduction and commentary
Committee for Accuracy in Middle East Reporting on Fodor's Exploring Israel by Andrew Sanger
An interview with Andrew Sanger on the website OyVaGoy, March 2009
Online interview with Andrew Sanger at Sketch and Travel website
 Snowbooks web page about The J-Word, a novel by Andrew Sanger
Page of published reviews of The-J-Word
Andrew Sanger on Twitter

1948 births
People educated at Colchester Royal Grammar School
Alumni of the University of Sussex
Alumni of University College London
English travel writers
British male journalists
Living people